Franco Bechtholdt Chervaz (born 15 August 1993), known as Franco Bechtholdt, is an Argentine-born Chilean football who plays as a midfielder for Curicó Unido since 2012.

Personal life
He is the son of the former footballer Carlos Bechtholdt and the brother of the footballer Nicolás Bechtholdt.

Notes

References

External links
 
 

1993 births
Living people
Footballers from Buenos Aires
Argentine footballers
Argentine people of German descent
Association football midfielders
Argentine expatriate footballers
Curicó Unido footballers
Primera B de Chile players
Expatriate footballers in Chile
Naturalized citizens of Chile